Sala Transilvania  is an indoor arena in Sibiu, Romania.

References

Indoor arenas in Romania
Basketball venues in Romania
Handball venues in Romania
Volleyball venues in Romania